Ilex ovalis is a species of flowing plant in the holly family Aquifoliaceae. It is native to Ecuador and Peru.

References

ovalis
Flora of Ecuador
Flora of Peru
Taxonomy articles created by Polbot